Nanjingnan (Nanjing South) railway station is a high-speed railway station in Nanjing, the capital of Jiangsu province, serving the Beijing–Shanghai (Jinghu) high-speed railway, Shanghai–Nanjing (Huning) intercity railway, Nanjing–Hangzhou (Ninghang) high-speed railway and the Shanghai–Wuhan–Chengdu (Huhanrong) high-speed railway. The new Nanjing South railway station is located a few kilometers south of downtown Nanjing in Yuhuatai District, and has a connection with the Nanjing Metro, served by Lines 1, 3, S1 and S3. Construction on the station began on 10 January 2008, and the station opened on 28 June 2011, two days before the opening of the Beijing–Shanghai high-speed railway.

Before the construction of the (New) Nanjing South Railway Station, the name "Nanjing South Railway Station" was applied to another station: a fairly minor rail station located just outside the Gate of China (Zhonghuamen) of Nanjing's walled city, much closer to the city centre than the new Nanjing South Railway Station. To avoid confusion, the (old) South Railway Station has now been renamed as the Zhonghuamen railway station.

Nanjing Metro

Line S1, connecting Nanjing South and the rest of the Nanjing Metro system with Lukou International Airport, opened on 1 July 2014. The connections with Lines 3 and S3 respectively opened on 1 April 2015 and 6 December 2017 with the opening of those lines.

On 30 September 2016 the metro station served a peak volume of 102,300 passengers.

See also
Nanjing railway station
Zhonghuamen railway station
Nanjing West railway station
Nanjing North railway station

References

External links

 Four Main Railways Pass Nanjing South Station, with Long-term Passenger Flow of 120 Million (Nanjing city government site)

Railway stations in Nanjing
Railway stations in China opened in 2011
Stations on the Beijing–Shanghai High-Speed Railway
Stations on the Shanghai–Nanjing Intercity Railway
Stations on the Nanjing–Anqing Intercity Railway
Stations on the Nanjing–Hangzhou High-Speed Railway
Nanjing Metro stations